The Thomas Hardye School is a secondary academy school in Dorchester, Dorset, England. It is also part of the DASP group.

History

Grammar school
The school is named after Thomas Hardye of Melcombe Regis and later Frampton. Hardye was a property owner who endowed the Dorchester "free" school in 1579, ten years after its completion by the town. He was an ancestor of novelist Thomas Hardy and Vice-Admiral Sir Thomas Hardy His monument is on the south wall of St. Peter's Church. The Tudor grammar school offered free education to boys of the town and neighbourhood and flourished under the Puritan regime of Revd. John White. It survived the doldrums of the 18th century, though at times having very few scholars, and struggled through the first half of the 19th century.  The Charity Commission eventually closed it whilst it was rebuilt, reopening in 1883.  It was known as Dorchester Grammar School until approximately 1952, when the name Hardye's School was adopted as a reminder of the 16th century founder and links to the Hardye family.

Though he had as a child attended Isaac Last's rival establishment in Durngate Street, the novelist Thomas Hardy laid one of the foundation stones for the school's new building on the out-of-town Fordington site in 1927. The land had previously belonged to the Duchy of Cornwall, and the new building was formally opened in 1928 by the Duke of Cornwall, the then Prince of Wales, and remained the 'Hardye's' site until 1992. The Memorial Gates, dedicated in 1957, escaped demolition and were moved to the new Thomas Hardye School. Dorchester Grammar School for Girls was opened in around 1930, and Dorchester Modern School some time after the 1944 Education Act. These schools formed the basis of the Thomas Hardye School.

Comprehensive
In 1980, Dorchester's secondary schools changed from the grammar school system (with three schools: separate boys’ and girls’ grammar schools and a mixed secondary modern) to comprehensive. Dorchester Grammar School for Girls combined with the female half of Dorchester Secondary Modern to form Castlefield School, based on the site of the Dorchester Secondary Modern School, while the boys of the Secondary Modern moved to the site of Hardye's School. The boys’ school had boarding facilities until 1982. The current school is a merger of the former Hardye's School (boys) and Castlefield School (girls) in 1990. The school moved to The Castlefield School site in 1992. The Hardye's School site was subsequently sold in 1995 and developed into housing.

On Friday 12 December 2008, the Prince of Wales and the Duchess of Cornwall visited the school to officially open the newly constructed library and sports hall.

Academy
On 1 August 2011, the Thomas Hardye School officially gained academy status under the UK Government scheme.

Removal of houses 
In the school year starting 2022, the current headteacher Nick Rutherford, has installed a plan to remove the traditional House system and instead replace it with a Year group based system. Houses up until this point had been advertised using coloured ties, like traditionally done, however this has adapted to the Year group system.

The reasons for this change include:

 Differentiating between year groups more easily
 Consistency of information - Rather than assemblies for houses, assemblies will now be in year groups this means that only relevant information is given to the relevant year group. At the same time.

Headmasters

 Robert Cheke (1595- )
 Gabriel Reeves
 Samuel Crumwelholme, MA (1657)
 Henry Dolling, LLB (1657- )
 Conyers Place, MA
 Rev. William Thornton
 John Jacob, LLB
 Rev. Edward Cozens, MA
 Rev. Edward Lee
 Rev. John Henchman
 Rev. John Hubbock, MA (1749- )
 Rev. John Watson
 Rev. John Cutler
 Rev. Henry John Richman, BCL
 Rev. Evan Davies, AB  (1814- )
 Ralph Hill 1927-55
 Anthony Hamilton 1955-74
 W M Thomas 1974-82
 P Close 1982-88
 Malin 1988-91
 A N Moore 1991-92
 Iain Melvin  1988-2010 (new site)
 Michael Foley 2011-2021
 Nick Rutherford 2021-

Admissions
The school provides government-funded education for children from Year 9 to Year 11, and takes them through GCSE and BTEC courses. It also has an integrated sixth form which takes pupils through A-Levels and AVCEs.

Sixth form
The school has the largest integrated sixth form in the United Kingdom which shares teachers, resources and facilities with the 'lower school'.

From 2008 to 2015 it offered the International Baccalaureate (IB).

The school has a partnership with local land-based college Kingston Maurward, offering practical alternatives to traditional A-levels.

Extracurricular activities

CCF 
The school currently has a CCF (Combined Cadet Force) that has been running for the last 100 years. The CCF has an Army contingent as well as an RAF section. They train regularly and compete on a national level. The Army contingent is cap-badged the Rifles was formerly Devonshire and Dorset Regiment and prior to that the Wessex Regiment. Also attached is a Drum Corps that performs annually at the Remembrance day parade, and regularly at other events such as school music performances and many other external events.

Model United Nations 
The Sixth Form's Model United Nations club regularly attend BISMUN (Bath) and BGSMUN (Bristol), as well as hosting its own in the summer. It has also sent delegates to MUNs abroad.

Debating club 
The school has a Debating Society, which has represented the school in the National Finals of the Oxford Union Debating Competition.

Performing arts 
Thomas Hardye's has a music department and an orchestra. It has a variety of opportunities from Chapel Choir to Jazz Club. The school hosts termly concerts as well as its weekly 'Friday Live' performances. The music department works with dance and drama to put on shows across the continent.

International

UNESCO status
In 2010, the school was awarded the UNESCO school status (one of just 54 in the UK) for the "global outlook of students" at the Hardye's. UNESCO aims to promote quality education as well as international perspectives in schools and such values as human rights, mutual respect and cultural diversity. The Thomas Hardye School has also been declared a 'World School' by the International Baccalaureate Organisation (IBO). Much of this recognition is thanks to a pupil who gained the title of UK Young Scientist of the Year.

BBC World Olympic Dreams 
After Sports Voice submitted an entry into the BBC scheme (which sees a UK school twinned with a former school of a London 2012 Olympic athlete), the Thomas Hardye School was twinned with The Doon School, in the northern Indian city of Dehradun. The all-boys private school is one of India's oldest education institutions and was the school of India's first individual Olympic gold medalist Abhinav Bindra. The schools communicate regularly and are represented by a member of staff and pupil who arrange projects to exchange culture and prepare for the London 2012 Summer Olympics.

Along with all the schools in Dorchester, Thomas Hardye has been part of the DASP Olympic Torch Relay in celebration of the Olympics.

Travel 
The school has annual (often biennial) educational/recreational trips to Florida, New York & Washington, D.C., Austria, Switzerland, Spain, France, Russia and Germany. Other trips include; India, Kenya, Indonesia, China, Italy and Slovenia as well as frequent trips to UK-wide destinations for competitions and educational enrichment. The school's Music Department have performed in some of Europe's most prestigious destinations and its chapel choir have sung in the likes of Bath Abbey, Salisbury Cathedral and performed with King's College, London choir.

Partner schools 
The school is twinned/associated with:
The Doon School, India since 2010 through the BBC and British Council's Olympic Dreams initiative
The Kabale School, Tanzania, has had major developments in its science programme thanks to financial help and visits from Hardye's
Instituto Maristas-Immaculada, Barcelona, Spain
Collège de Hérault, France
Muhaka Primary School, Kenya was partly built by pupils from the Thomas Hardye School
George Green's School, Tower Hamlets (London) have been linked with the school through Humanities projects
Grace Secondary School, Sudan is funded by a Dorchester-based charity and supports by Hardyes
Haberdashers' Hatcham College, Lewisham
IES Mariano Baquero Goyanes, Murcia, Spain
Lycée Alain Chartier, Bayeux, France.

Facilities
All departments have IT rooms. The school has a theatre (refurbished in June 2022) and a library with over 30,000 books. The school also uses the neighbouring artificial pitch and pools of the local sports centre operated by the not-for-profit trust 1610. The school has playing fields.

Notable former pupils

 Orlando Bailey, Rugby Union Fly Half for Bath Rugby.
 Bill Baker, Conservative MP from 1964 to 1974 for Banffshire
 Aaron Cook attended the school but left prematurely to pursue his training for the Beijing 2008 Summer Olympics
 Roger Gale, Conservative MP since 1983 for North Thanet, and former BBC producer
 Prof John Gillingham CBE, Professor of Neurological Surgery from 1963 to 1980 at the University of Edinburgh, and a pioneer of stereotactic surgery
 Roger Hearing,  journalist and news presenter with the BBC World Service
 Paul Hillier, classical singer, conductor and musical director
 Paddy Milner, singer and composer
 Rt Rev Michael Perham, Bishop of Gloucester 2004-14
 Tom Prior, actor
 Tom Roberts, Australian painter of the Heidelberg School
 Thomas Ward, mathematician
 Simon Winchester, journalist

See also 
List of English and Welsh endowed schools (19th century)

References

External links
 
 The Hardyeans Club
 EduBase

Schools in Dorchester, Dorset
Upper schools in Dorset
Academies in Dorset
Training schools in England